"Haunted Heart" is a song written by Buddy Brock and Kim Williams, and recorded by American country music artist Sammy Kershaw. It was released in May 1993 as the second single and title track from the album Haunted Heart.  The song reached #9 on the Billboard Hot Country Singles & Tracks chart.

Music video
The music video was directed by Michael Merriman and premiered in mid-1993.

Chart performance
"Haunted Heart" debuted at number 71 on the U.S. Billboard Hot Country Singles & Tracks for the week of May 8, 1993.

References

1993 singles
1993 songs
Sammy Kershaw songs
Song recordings produced by Buddy Cannon
Song recordings produced by Norro Wilson
Mercury Records singles
Songs written by Kim Williams (songwriter)
Songs written by Buddy Brock
Black-and-white music videos